is a Japanese footballer who plays for Vissel Kobe on loan from FC Machida Zelvia in the J2 League.

Career
He is a versatile defender who can operate as a left full back or as a centre back. Takahashi began his professional career with Tokyo Verdy in March 2007 at the age of 17.

Club career statistics
Updated to 19 February 2019.

References

External links
Profile at Jubilo Iwata

 

1991 births
Living people
People from Higashiyamato, Tokyo
Association football people from Tokyo Metropolis
Japanese footballers
J1 League players
J2 League players
Tokyo Verdy players
Omiya Ardija players
Vissel Kobe players
Júbilo Iwata players
FC Machida Zelvia players
Association football defenders